Pierre-Hugues Herbert and Adil Shamasdin were the defending champions but only Shamasdin chose to defend his title, partnering Sander Arends. Shamasdin lost in the quarterfinals to Dennis Novak and Tristan-Samuel Weissborn.

Denys Molchanov and Igor Zelenay won the title after defeating Jonathan Eysseric and Joe Salisbury 7–6(7–4), 6–2 in the final.

Seeds

Draw

External Links
 Main Draw

Tunis Open - Doubles
2018 Doubles